Cresera is a genus of moths in the family Erebidae. The genus was described by Schaus in 1894.

Species
Cresera affinis (Rothschild, 1909)
Cresera annulata Schaus, 1894
Cresera espiritosantensis Rego Barros, 1958
Cresera hieroglyphica (Schaus, 1905)
Cresera ilioides (Schaus, 1905)
Cresera ilus (Cramer, [1776])
Cresera intensa (Rothschild, 1909)
Cresera ockendeni (Rothschild, 1909)
Cresera optima (Butler, 1877)
Cresera silvestrii Travassos, 1956
Cresera similis (Rothschild, 1909)
Cresera tinguaensis Rego Barros, 1957

References

External links

Oliveira Emery, Eduardo de. (April 18, 2006). "O gênero neotropical Cresera (Lepidoptera, Arctiinae, Phaegopterini)".

Phaegopterina
Moth genera